Scott Wilson (born 8 November 1970) is an Australian former professional rugby league footballer who played in the 1980s and 1990s.

Playing career
Wilson as a youngster played in the South Sydney Juniors competition for Coogee Randwick Wombats. While at South Sydney High School in 1986, Wilson was selected to play for the Australian Schoolboys team.

Wilson made his first grade début in Round 8 of the 1988 season against Manly-Warringah Sea Eagles at Brookvale Oval, 25 April, coming off the bench in the second half. It later transpired that he was used as an illegal replacement and South Sydney were ultimately stripped of the two competition points they earned that afternoon.

Wilson played for six first-grade clubs during his career: South Sydney Rabbitohs, North Sydney Bears,  (twice), Gold Coast, Western Reds and North Queensland Cowboys. He also played for Salford and Warrington Wolves.

Wilson was selected to represent New South Wales as an interchange for game III of the 1997 Super League Tri-series against New Zealand.

Career highlights
 First Grade Debut: 1988 - Round 8, Rabbitohs vs Manly-Warringah Sea Eagles at Brookvale Oval, 25 April
 Representative Selection: 1997 - Game III, Super League Tri-series, NSW vs New Zealand at Bruce Stadium, 14 May, winning 20–15

Footnotes

External links
Profile at bulldogs.com.au

1970 births
Living people
Australian rugby league players
Canterbury-Bankstown Bulldogs players
Gold Coast Chargers players
New South Wales rugby league team players
North Queensland Cowboys players
North Sydney Bears players
Rugby league centres
Rugby league five-eighths
Rugby league fullbacks
Rugby league wingers
Salford Red Devils players
South Sydney Rabbitohs players
Warrington Wolves players
Western Reds players